is the 12th single by Japanese singer Maaya Sakamoto. It was her first single that was not composed by Yoko Kanno.

"Loop" was used as the ending theme for the first season of Tsubasa Chronicle.

Single track listing

Charts

References 

2005 singles
Maaya Sakamoto songs
2005 songs
Victor Entertainment singles
Songs with music by H-Wonder